Godumakunta is a village in Rangareddy district in Telangana, India. It falls under Keesara mandal.

References

Villages in Ranga Reddy district